Tagudin, officially the Municipality of Tagudin, is a 2nd class municipality in the province of Ilocos Sur, Philippines. According to the 2020 census, it has a population of 41,538 people.

Etymology
The name of the municipality was derived from a native cotton drying rack called "tagudan."  A Spaniard who came to the place asking its name wrote it as its name when told by a resident, who thought that he was asking the name of the traditional apparatus she's using.

History

According to William Scott, "Chinese and Japanese ships bartered gold in Tagudin in Juan de Salcedo's day."

Records of Saint Augustine's Parish record that Spanish Conquistadors headed by Juan de Salcedo, together with the Augustinian missionaries started to move northward of Manila in 1571.
On 5 January 1586 they founded the first towns of Laoag, Bulatao, Kaog and Tagudin.
In 1818 Tagudin became a part of Ilocos Sur and thus the southern gateway to the province.
The first two sundials were constructed in Tagudin in 1841 and 1845, respectively, by Father Juan Sorolla.
The decisive Battle of Bessang Pass started in this municipality, at Bitalag.
On 18 August 1908, Tagudin replaced Alilem as the capital of the sub-province of Amburayan, which included Lepanto (that became a sub-province now included in the province of Benguet), Angkaki (now Quirino), Suyo, and Alilem (now with Ilocos Sur), and Sudipen, Santol, and San Gabriel (formerly with Ilocos Sur but became part of La Union).
Tagudin was made the site of the Base Hospital of the United States Armed Forces in the Philippines-Northern Luzon (USAFIP-NL) in 1945 during World War II.
Tagudin was the site of the military general headquarters of the Philippine Commonwealth Army 1st and 12th Infantry Division and the USAFIP-NL 121st Infantry Regiments.  They were stationed in the town and was active during World War II (1942 to 1945) and Post-War Era (1945 to 1946).

Geography

Barangays
Tagudin is politically subdivided into 43 barangays.

Climate

Demographics

In the 2020 census, Tagudin had a population of 41,538.

Economy

Government
Tagudin, belonging to the second congressional district of the province of Ilocos Sur, is governed by a mayor designated as its local chief executive and by a municipal council as its legislative body in accordance with the Local Government Code. The mayor, vice mayor, and the councilors are elected directly by the people through an election which is being held every three years.

Elected officials

References

External links

Tagudin website
Pasyalang Ilocos Sur
Philippine Standard Geographic Code
Philippine Census Information
Local Governance Performance Management System

Municipalities of Ilocos Sur